Xenothecium is a genus of fungus in the family Hyponectriaceae; according to the 2007 Outline of Ascomycota, the placement in this family was uncertain. In 2020 it was confirmed. This is a monotypic genus, its only species being Xenothecium jodophilum. It was published by Franz Xaver Rudolf von Höhnel in Sber. Akad. Wiss. Wien, Math.-naturw. Kl., Abt. 1 vol.128 (7-8) on page 589 in 1919.

References

External links
Index Fungorum

Amphisphaeriales
Monotypic Ascomycota genera
Taxa named by Franz Xaver Rudolf von Höhnel